

Women's 100 m EAD Freestyle - Final

Women's 100 m EAD Freestyle - Heats

Women's 100 m EAD Freestyle - Heat 01

Women's 100 m EAD Freestyle - Heat 02

References 

100 metres EAD freestyle
2006 in women's swimming